Manuel Schmid may refer to:

 Manuel Schmid (footballer), Austrian footballer
 Manuel Schmid (skier), German alpine skier